Someswaram is a village in Rayavaram Mandal in East Godavari District of Andhra Pradesh, India. Is there Someswara Swamy temple Lord siva is one of the astha(8) Soma lingas in Drakasharama

Demographics
Total population of Someswaram is 8715. Males are 4408 and Females are 4,307 living in 2230 Houses. Total area of Someswaram is 799 hectares.

References

Villages in East Godavari district